is the titular protagonist of the Samurai Shodown series of video games, as well as one of its most known characters alongside Nakoruru. He was introduced in the original Samurai Shodown in 1993 and has since appeared in every title in the series.

The character was based on the famed swordsman, Miyamoto Musashi, a duelist who claimed to have never lost a match. Though he is a swordsman with no loyalties to any lord, Haohmaru has a "samurai spirit" which is often stressed in the series. He is also often accredited to defeating most of the series' villains.

Appearances

Samurai Shodown
Haohmaru appears in all Samurai Shodown games and their other-media adaptations. According to his backstory, at the age of fifteen he challenged the series' version of Jubei Yagyu to a duel but lost due to lack of experience. Jubei, amused by the youth's bravado, brought Haohmaru to Nicotine Caffeine so that he may gain proper training. Whilst living there, Haohmaru also met and befriended Kibagami Genjuro, fellow student and another orphan like himself. One day, Nicotine told them they would battle to determine who would learn the secrets in a magical scroll to increase their fighting ability. Genjuro won but almost killed Haohmaru; in response, Nicotine banished Genjuro which began the latter's grudge against Haohmaru and Nicotine. Encouraged by this defeat to further improve himself, Haohmaru travelled the lands, perfecting his sword skills and searching for worthy challengers in the name of Ashura. During his many travels, Haohmaru also raised Shizumaru Hisame and trained him to be a fighter.

Haohmaru fell in love with a girl named Oshizu, but he eventually leaves her for his travels in Samurai Shodown VI even as she begs him to stay with her. In the same game, it is shown that Haohmaru shares a close relationship with Charlotte Christine de Colde, even travelling all the way to France in order to visit her. In Samurai Shodown: Warriors Rage, Haohmaru is a skilled and active swordsman at the age of forty-seven. At this time, he is trying to find his adopted niece, Mikoto and bring her back home. Samurai Shodown V character Rasetsumaru is a monstrous doppelganger of Haohmaru.

However, in the 1994 motion picture Haohmaru has a different story, where he was raised by a mother, who dying reveals she has found him as a baby in a forest after seeing a shooting star. Haohmaru lives with her, and is a famous samurai in the region, often asked missions like one to kill a cattle killing bear, and loves sake so much that rejects a princess hand in marriage in favour of lots of bottles of it as reward, people from his village started to disappear and he later discover they were kidnapped by people from the nearby Edo fortress to be part of Amakusa's army and Haohmaru then joins forces with other characters such as Nakoruru, Charlotte and others to stop her schemes.

Other appearances
Haohmaru also made appearances in several other video games by SNK and other developers, including fighting games Capcom vs. SNK 2, SNK vs. Capcom: The Match of the Millennium, Neo Geo Battle Coliseum, mobile game Neo Geo Tennis Coliseum, dating sim Days of Memories: Oedo Love Scroll, The King of Fighters All Star, multiplayer online battle arena Honor of Kings, Granblue Fantasy, and battle arena game Lost Saga. Neo Geo Battle Coliseum developers stated that no matter what the fans wanted, they wanted to include Samurai Shodown characters and made Haohmaru's inclusion one of their top priorities in development. He also makes regular appearances in the series' merchandise, including at least two action figures.

He is also a part of Soulcalibur VI season pass 2. This news was announced during EVO 2019 on August 4 in the season 2 trailer after the Cassandra Alexandra release date trailer shows that she is a part of season pass 1. It has been made apparent that Haohmaru is always been the SNK counterpart to the Soulcalibur series veteran Heishiro Mitsurugi prior to his gameplay trailer at EVO Japan 2020. He was released at the end of March 2020. His pack also comes with Nakoruru and Kuroko Costume sets. Soulcalibur series marks the first time he uses his sake-jug as a sub-weapon. If the fighters fight at Haohmaru's DLC home stage, Gairyu Isle, Samurai Shodown main announcer Kuroko will be that stage's announcer, rather than a regular announcer.

In EVO 2022, Haohmaru properly made his debut in a mainline entry of The King of Fighters series, via DLC Team on The King of Fighters XV, a Samurai Shodown Team, set to be released around Autumn 2022. Nakoruru, who was a Team leader of Another World Team (previously consisted of pachinko characters Mui Mui and Love Heart (prior to the rights of the latter's series Sky Love being sold to Highlight Entertainment)) back in The King of Fighters XIV, eventually found Haohmaru and Darli Dagger (the latter from Samurai Shodown (2019)) to be displaced in the present by the result of Amplified Specters' powers and Otoma=Raga as well, and forms a team with them, presumably to return to their home timeline through joining the fifteenth tournament, before deciding alongside a recently revived, yet still weakened Mizuki Rashojin to stay in the present.

Haohmaru appears as a spirit in Super Smash Bros. Ultimate.

Design and gameplay
Haohmaru's creation was inspired by the famous historical samurai Miyamoto Musashi. He was actually called 'Musashi' during the development of the first Samurai Shodown game. The series' creator Yasushi Adachi chose "the two flagship characters" Haohmaru and Nakoruru as the ones that best sum up the series: "With his use of powerful and damaging attacks as well as the Ikari gauge that increases attack power, Haohmaru does a great job representing the myriad of concepts game systems in these games."

His trademark moves are "Kogetsuzan," a crescent-shaped uppercut, and "Senpuretsuzan," a whirlwind projectile which lifts opponents into the air (like a hurricane) before dropping them on their heads. He also has a sake jug, which he uses to 'bless' his blade with liquor before he fights. In Samurai Shodown II, he may swing his jug in battle for a multi-hit short-range attack or alternatively use it to reflect projectiles. He also gained a somersault attack, which could cause massive damage upon crouching foes. When his style splits in Samurai Shodown III, his "Slash" form retains several strategies used in previous games, being a balanced and easy-to-master mid-range combatant. By contrast, his "Bust" form alters several moves, granting him access to aggressive close-combat fighting. His appearance in Warriors Rage for the PlayStation also combined some elements from Genjuro's fighting style such as his stance and crouching strikes.

Reception
Haohmaru was well received, often regarded as a classic character or an "old favorite." In the Japanese Gamest magazine's 1997 Heroes Collection, Haohmaru was tied with Ukyo for their 29th spot (out of 50) in the staff's list of favorite arcade gaming characters. Greg Kasavin from GameSpot listed his "Crescent Moon Slash" move as one of the best special attacks in fighting games' history. Complex cited Haohmaru while including Samurai Shodown V on their list of top games with Fatality-like special moves, and included him among the fighters with most humiliating quotes. GamesRadar included him in a potential roster of their dream fighting game "Vertigo Vs. SNK" and Sony Online Entertainment art director Timothy Heydelaar took Haohmaru as his nickname.

References

External links
Official website

Fictional Japanese people in video games
Fictional kenjutsuka
Fictional samurai
Fictional swordfighters in video games
Male characters in video games
Samurai Shodown characters
SNK protagonists
Video game characters based on real people
Video game characters introduced in 1993